The 2009–10 season was the 108th season in the history of Norwich City. It was the club's first season in Football League One (third tier of the English football pyramid) for 49 years, following relegation from The Championship in 2008–09. However, they gained promotion back to the second tier as league champions with a club record total of 95 points, finishing nine points ahead of runners-up Leeds United. This article shows statistics and lists all matches played by the club during the season.

Board and staff members

Board members

Coaching staff

Players

First team squad
Squad at end of season

Left club during season

Transfers

In

 Total spending:  ~ £0,650,000

Out

 Total income:  ~ £1,150,000

Loans in

Loans out

Competitions

Pre-season
Note: this section relates to first team friendlies only.

League

August

Norwich had high expectations after a good pre-season campaign, however a disastrous opening game of the season saw City suffer a record-breaking home defeat, losing 7–1 to Colchester United. Although the Canaries then went on to win 4-0 at Yeovil in the League Cup, Bryan Gunn was sacked and Paul Lambert - the man who had masterminded Colchester's victory against Norwich a few days previously - would be named as his successor, following a 1–1 draw away at Exeter City. Despite losing to Brentford, with the new manager sat in the stands, Lambert's first game in the dug-out saw City beat Wycombe 5–2 at Carrow Road before going on to win their first away league game of the season at Hartlepool (either side of a 1-4 home defeat to Premier League Sunderland in the League Cup), with Canaries fans starting to see signs of a recovery.

September

After putting together an encouraging run at the end of August, September proved to be a more frustrating month for City. Starting off with a goalless draw at home to Walsall, Norwich followed that up with a 2–1 away defeat to MK Dons thanks to a dubious penalty awarded to the home side. Second-placed Charlton were next up at Carrow Road, and they quickly took control with an early 2-0 lead before Wes Hoolahan, recalled to the team, scored just before half time and eventually Grant Holt grabbed a last-minute equaliser to salvage a point. The Canaries then travelled to Gillingham the following week, where they found themselves both a goal down and a man down at halftime after goalkeeper Frazer Forster was sent off. But for the second game in succession, City showed fight and determination and once again grabbed a 90th-minute equaliser, this time through Darel Russell. Viewed by some as a turning point, Norwich then eased past Leyton Orient - winning 4-0 at Carrow Road - in the final game of September.

October

October proved to be the month when Norwich really started climbing up the table. Days after their 4–0 win over Leyton Orient City followed it by a 5–1 win over Bristol Rovers before grabbing a hard-fought 1–0 win away at Carlisle courtesy of a Wes Hoolahan goal. 3 wins on the trot and 10 goals scored meant Norwich were now in a play off place. Next up for Norwich was top of the league Leeds who already looked to be running away with the league. Some would argue City were the better side in this game and City looked to be heading for a point, however Frazer Forster's miskick meant Leeds won the game with virtually the last kick of the game. However City went on to win their next two games of October beating play off chasing Swindon at Carrow Road 1–0 and then a 3–1 away win at Stockport. This meant five wins out of 6 in October and Norwich were only 4 points off second placed Charlton

November

City only had three league games in November due to cup commitments and they went through the month unbeaten. They grabbed a 2–0 win over struggling Tranmere before drawing 2–2 away at improving Southampton. They followed this up with a 4–1 win over Brighton at home. Grant Holt, Chris Martin and Wes Hoolahan all scored and all three were beginning to rack up the goals for Norwich

December

For the second month in succession, Norwich went unbeaten and by the end of December had begun to really put pressure on the top 2. First up was a 3-0 away win at Southend - a ground the Canaries hadn't won at for 57 years. Following a goalless first half, the visitors turned on the style in the second half with a double from talismanic striker Grant Holt and another from academy-product Korey Smith. This was followed up with a routine 2–0 home win over Oldham, before what proved to be one of City's most exciting games of the season away at Yeovil. The home side took the lead in the first half through ex-Ipswich striker Dean Bowditch, before Norwich came back in the second half with goals from Chris Martin and Gary Doherty giving the Canaries a 2–1 lead. However, Yeovil quickly equalised and then looked to have won it after a 90th-minute goal, before a Russell Martin shot deflected off Gary Doherty in injury-time to ensure a share of the spoils. Two home matches against fellow promotion chasers came next, with Huddersfield Town the first to be dispatched - being defeated 3–0 - before a 2-0 Boxing Day success over Millwall left Norwich just 2 points shy of second-placed Charlton.

January

January proved to be a pivotal month for Norwich and they started it with a 1–0 win away at struggling Wycombe. Although the Canaries dominated the game they failed to make the breakthrough, and indeed were living dangerously at times with the home side coming close to taking the lead but for the width of the post. But Korey Smith eventually struck the winner in the 79th minute to send Norwich second in the league and into the automatic places for the first time this season. City followed this up with a 3–1 win at home to Exeter, which meant that they went into arguably their biggest game of the season so far - the return fixture against Colchester (with whom there had been considerable bad feeling brewing since Lambert's departure to Carrow Road) - in solid form. After the 7–1 drubbing on the opening day of the season and Paul Lambert's return to Colchester, it had all the makings of a classic. Ultimately though, the match merely served as a way for Norwich to exact fitting revenge, thrashing their hosts 5–0 on an extremely waterlogged pitch. A Chris Martin double put City 2–0 up at half-time before Gary Doherty, Grant Holt and Oli Johnson made it 5–0, with Wes Hoolahan's missed penalty proving not to be costly, whilst Colchester finished the match with 10 men thanks to Ian Henderson's sending off against his former side. On top of handing out a convincing defeat in a local derby, Norwich had now also closed the gap to league-leaders Leeds, and due to the latter's cup commitments, meant that City would usurp Leeds with a win over Brentford in their next match. That task was made more difficult after Grant Holt's sending off in the first half, but they still managed to see out a 1–0 win thanks to a Chris Martin goal. The Canaries now sat above Leeds on goal difference, albeit having played two games more. Another late come-from-behind win at Walsall in their next game, coupled with Leeds slipping to defeat, saw Norwich consolidate their position at the top of the table, extending their lead to three points. City ended the month with a 2–1 win over Hartlepool at Carrow Road, in a match that would see them record their highest attendance of the season, giving them a perfect record of 6 wins from 6 games in January.

February

City got off to a bad start in February, losing 2–1 away at Millwall despite taking an early lead – their first defeat since October, however, they bounced back with a fortunate 2–1 win away at Brighton. The Canaries were 1–0 down going into the final 10 minutes of the match, before Lambert's gamble of having four strikers on the pitch ultimately paid off as Norwich grabbed two late goals through Holt and Doherty to snatch three vital points. In their next game City again suffered defeat, losing 0-2 to Southampton in what was their first home loss under Paul Lambert, but they had a chance to put it right against their next opponents when struggling Southend came to Carrow Road. Despite their respective league positions, it was Southend who scored first, and indeed were still leading 1–0 with only 11 minutes remaining, before super-sub Oli Johnson came on to score two late goals - the winner arriving in the 94th minute - to clinch the game for Norwich in the most dramatic of circumstances. The final game of the month saw the Canaries see out a 1–0 win away at Oldham, which - coupled with inconsistent results for their promotion rivals across February - was enough to have built-up a 5-point gap on second-placed Leeds and, crucially, a 9-point gap on third-placed Charlton.

March

As the season started to reach the business end of proceedings, March was a hugely important month for Norwich with fixtures against 3 promotion chasers, including a home game against second-placed Leeds. City began with an easy 3–0 win over Yeovil at Carrow Road, before a tricky looking match at Huddersfield - who were unbeaten at their Galpharm Stadium going into this game - and had put in some impressive home displays. After a disappointing first half, Norwich found themselves 1–0 down going into the break, however, a stirring comeback in the second half saw Grant Holt, who had a hand in all of the goals, grabbing the equaliser before on-loan striker Stephen Elliot bagged a brace to give the Canaries a massive 3–1 win. Next up was a trip to 4th-placed Swindon Town who, despite falling a goal behind to Grant Holt's second-half header, managed to salvage a 92nd-minute equaliser in a 1–1 draw. This set the stage for the visit of out-of-form Leeds to Carrow Road and presented Norwich with the opportunity of moving 11 points clear of their nearest rivals if they could muster a victory. The game itself proved to be a tight and cagey affair, but with 89 minutes on the clock, substitute Chris Martin headed home what was to be another dramatic late winner for the Canaries, leaving them ahead of the chasing pack by considerable distance with just 8 games of the season to go.

April

Heading into April and given their advantage at the top of the table, Norwich knew that all that was required was to see the job through to earn promotion. However, the first game of the month proved to be one of the more bizarre games of the season. Away to struggling Tranmere, the home side were awarded two highly dubious penalties in the opening 10 minutes, scoring both, with Fraser Forster also being sent off for Norwich. Tranmere then added a third despite a clear handball, to leave the Canaries furious with the inexplicable performance of referee Eddie Ilderton, before they managed a consolation goal in the second half  - but the damage had already been done and the game ended 3–1. Norwich were at least given the perfect opportunity to put things right after that with a home game against bottom team Stockport County following three days later. Whilst the Canaries were far from their best, the game ended in a 2–1 home win that saw Grant Holt become the first Norwich player since 1964 to score 30 goals in a season. MK Dons were the visitors to Carrow Road a few days later in what proved to be a fiery affair. The Dons went 1–0 up in the first half, with City being denied a clear-cut penalty in the second half as the game grew increasingly bad-tempered - the visitors racked up a total of 9 yellow cards (including two for goal-scorer Aaron Wilbraham which saw led to his dismissal) - but once again Chris Martin scored a late goal to rescue a point. With promotion looking as if it could be sealed as early as the next game, City headed to east London to play mid-table Leyton Orient, backed by a bumper away crowd. Unfortunately, it wasn't to be their day as the Canaries were defeated 2–1 by a spirited home side. However, they had a chance to put this right at Charlton. If results went their way, Norwich could be promoted with a win at the ground at which they were relegated 11 months previously. City went ahead through a Michael Nelson header in the first half and, after some terrific saves from Fraser Forster, survived the Charlton onslaught to seal the win and promotion back to the Championship at the first time of asking. Considering their opening day mauling and the 15-point lead that Leeds had once held, it was a monumental achievement for Norwich. It also meant that they only needed 1 point from their remaining three games to seal the title - which was duly delivered in their next game following a 2-0 home win over Gillingham.

May

With promotion and the League One title already sealed, it was a case of ending the season on a high for the impressive Canaries. Early promotion contenders Bristol Rovers were comfortably defeated 3-0 in Norwich's final away game of the season, before a surprise 0-2 loss to Carlisle ensured that City finished the season as they started it - with a home defeat. Ultimately though, this did little to dampen the fans' and players' promotion celebrations at the final whistle, with everyone associated with the Canaries left to reflect on what had been a hugely memorable and successful season, which saw them finish 9 points ahead of second-placed Leeds and 10 points clear of third-placed Millwall. Norwich also finished the season as the league's highest scorers, with a huge 89 goals scored across the season.

FA Cup

Due to being in League One, City started in the FA Cup in the first round for a number of years. They started off with a potential banana skin away at non-league Paulton Rovers. However City made easy work of Paulton winning 7–0, although City would not make it to the third round of the cup, losing 3–1 away at Carlisle

League Cup

Norwich once again failed to make any sort of real impact in the Carling Cup, going out in the second round. They managed to pick up a 4–0 away win away at Yeovil with Grant Holt getting a hat-trick in what proved to be Bryan Gunn's final game as manager. Then, in Paul Lambert's second as manager, they lost 4–1 with Lambert putting out a below strength team. Wes Hoolahan grabbed the only goal. The game ended bizarrely with Michael Spillane sent off. Ben Alnwick was forced off injured so City were down to nine men and Cody McDonald was forced to go in goal.

Football League Trophy

League table

See also 
2009–10 in English football

References

Notes

Norwich City F.C. seasons
Norwich City